Arthur E. "Art" Webb (February 17, 1893 – April 12, 1973) was a player in the National Football League. He first played with the Rochester Jeffersons during the 1920 NFL season. After a year away from the NFL, he played with the Milwaukee Badgers during the 1922 NFL season.

References

1893 births
1973 deaths
Milwaukee Badgers players
Rochester Jeffersons players
Players of American football from Syracuse, New York